The Mongolia women's national football team represents Mongolia in international women's association football. the team is governed by Mongolian Football Federation (MFF) and competes in AFC and EAFF women's competitions. the Mongolian team's first activity was in 2018 when they entered for the first time the preliminary round of 2019 EAFF Women's E-1 Football Championship.

History

Beginning
With women's association football starting to flourish in Asia and especially in East Asia. the Mongolian Football Federation announced new policies to improve the women's game in the country, the federation appointed the Japanese coach Iki Yoji to support women's football development. later in 2016, the Japanese coach was reappointed as coach of the u-16 girls' team. in which within one year period. the team debuted internationally by participating in category C of the East Asian U-16 girls competition in 2017, history was made as the Mongolian team managed to score their first goal internationally and win their first match since debuting. the MFF had initial plans to debut the senior team in the 2017 EAFF E-1 Football Championship, however, they withdrew before the preliminary round started.

in 2018 the EAFF announced that Mongolia will be hosting the 2019 EAFF E-1 Football Championship Preliminary Round, Mongolia started its international football journey led by their coach Ganbold Tsedevsuren with a win against Northern Mariana Islands. in which they came from behind of two-goal, to win the match three goals to two in front of a home crowd with an estimated of 421 attendant. Narmandakh Namuunaa scored Mongolia first goal. in their second match against Guam the Mongolian have beaten the odds with an impressive one-nil win. with 6 points Mongolia leads the table. the third matchday saw Mongolia and Macau played to a scoreless draw in their last match. history was made as Mongolia advanced to the Second preliminary round winning the first round undefeated.

In October 2018, the Mongolian federation announce its participation in the 2020 AFC Women's Olympic Qualifying Tournament to be the first major tournament outside of East Asia. the team was drawn to face Tajikistan the host and the Philippines, Singapore and Chinese Taipei.

Results and fixtures

The following is a list of match results in the last 12 months, as well as any future matches that have been scheduled.

Legend

2022

2023

Coaching staff

Current coaching staff

Manager history

, after the match against .

Players

Current squad
The following players were called up for the 2022 AFC Women's Asian Cup qualification from 17 to 20 September 2021.

Caps and goals correct as of 20 September 2021, after the match against .

Recent call-ups
The following players have been called up to the squad in the past 12 months.

Records

*Players in bold are still active, at least at club level.

Most capped players

Top goalscorers
As of 20 September 2021

Competitive record

FIFA Women's World Cup

*Draws include knockout matches decided on penalty kicks.

Olympic Games

*Draws include knockout matches decided on penalty kicks.

AFC Women's Asian Cup

*Draws include knockout matches decided on penalty kicks.

EAFF E-1 Football Championship

*Draws include knockout matches decided on penalty kicks.

Asian Games

*Draws include knockout matches decided on penalty kicks.

See also

Sport in Mongolia
Football in Mongolia
Women's football in Mongolia
Mongolia men's national football team

References

External links

Asian women's national association football teams
Mongolia women's national football team